The Guarani languages are a group of half a dozen or so languages in the Tupi–Guarani language family. The best known language in this family is Guarani, one of the national languages of Paraguay, alongside Spanish.

The Guarani languages are:
Guarani dialect chain: Western Bolivian Guarani (Simba), Eastern Bolivian Guarani (Chawuncu; Ava, Tapieté dialects), Paraguayan Guaraní (Guarani), Chiripá Guaraní (Nhandéva, Avá), Mbyá Guaraní (Mbya)
 Kaiwá (Paí Tavyterá dialect)
 Aché (Guayaki) (several dialects)
? Xetá

The varieties of Guarani proper and Kaiwá have limited mutual intelligibility. Aché and Guarani are not mutually intelligible. The position of Xetá is unclear.

See also 
WikiProject Guaraní

Notes